Astère Michel Dhondt (born 12 October 1937) is a Flemish writer.

Bibliography
 God in Vlaanderen, 1965.
 Zeven geestige knaapjes, 1966.
 De wilde jacht. Amsterdam, 1968.
 Gezangen en gebeden. Een selektie 1965–68, 1969.
 De Koning en de Koningin van Sikkem in de Haarlemmerhouttuinen. Gedichten, Spelen, Brieven 1968–1971, 1971.
 Sinbad de Zeeroverj, 1973.
 De brieven van de troubadour, 1975.
 De vruchten van het veld, 1977.
 De lieverdjes van Amsterdam, gefotografeerd door Astère Michel Dhondt 1968–69. St. Odiliënberg, Corrie Zelen, 1977.

Awards
 1966 - Arkprijs van het Vrije Woord

Sources
 

1937 births
Flemish writers
Living people
Ark Prize of the Free Word winners